The men's C-1 1000 metres event was an open-style, individual canoeing event conducted as part of the Canoeing at the 1984 Summer Olympics program.

Medallists

Results

Heats
Eleven competitors were entered with one disqualification. Held on August 7, the top three finishers in each heat moved on to the final with the others relegated to the semifinal.

Semifinal
Taking place on August 9, the top three finishers in the semifinal advanced to the final.

Final
The final took place on August 11.

References
1984 Summer Olympics official report Volume 2, Part 2. p. 370. 
Sports-reference.com 1984 C-1 1000 m results.

Men's C-1 1000
Men's events at the 1984 Summer Olympics